Guarulhos is a Brazilian municipality. It is the second most populous city in the Brazilian state of São Paulo, the 13th most populous city in Brazil, and is also the most populous city in the country that is not a state capital. In the last few years it has outgrown Campinas. It is part of the Metropolitan Region of São Paulo. Its population is 1,221,927 with an area of 318.68 km2.

Overview

The name comes from the Tupi language, and means "Eaters", "big-bellied people"; a reference to the original indigenous inhabitants of the area.

It ranks eighth by GDP among Brazilian cities; second in São Paulo state. (source:IBGE, Brazil's national institute of statistics. GDP by cities report, published in 2005 with data from 2002). It is the tenth largest suburb in the world. The per capita income for the municipality is R$12,793. São Paulo-Guarulhos International Airport (GRU), one of the main Brazilian airports, is located there. The city is the seat of the Roman Catholic Diocese of Guarulhos.

The municipality contains part of the  Cantareira State Park, created in 1962, which protects a large part of the metropolitan São Paulo water supply.
It also contains part of the  Mananciais do Rio Paraíba do Sul Environmental Protection Area, created in 1982 to protect the sources of the Paraíba do Sul river.

History

Guarulhos was founded on December 8, 1560, by the Jesuit priest Manuel de Paiva and entitled Nossa Senhora da Conceição. Its origin is linked to five other small villages that were in charge of defending the boundaries of São Paulo de Piratininga Village against the Tamoios, a wild tribe of Indians that lived in that region.

In the 16th Century, Guarulhos was a strategic location: it bordered the future São Paulo's Capital and was surrounded by the rivers Tietê (south), and Cabuçu (east). On that same period, was established, for similar purposes, São Miguel Village, called nowadays São Miguel Paulista District.

In 1880, Guarulhos was emancipated from São Paulo and named Nossa Senhora da Conceição dos Guarulhos. Its current name, Guarulhos, was adopted later, after the enactment of the law # 1.021, on November 6, 1906.

At the beginning of the twentieth century, the city was remarked by the settlement of railroads and the power electricity system (Light & Power C.O.), by numerous requests for the implantation of a telephone
system, industrial building permits, by commercial activities, and public transportation.

During the 1930s, the city witnessed the actions of the Federal Intervention and the Constitutional Movement (Reflections of the Revolution that marked the end of the "Old Republic" during the 1930s in Brazil).

In 1940 the Monteiro Lobato Municipal Library was founded, in 1941, the first Health Center of the city, and ten years after that, the Holy House of Mercy of Guarulhos was established. On that decade arrive in the municipality Industries from different sectors: electricity; metallurgy; plastics; food; rubber; footwear; vehicles; clocks, and leather.

In 1945 the São Paulo's Air Base (BASP) was transferred from the Campo de Marte, a little airport in São Paulo, to Cumbica neighborhood in Guarulhos.

In 1958 the Rotary Club established a branch in the city.

The Municipal Conservatory of Guarulhos was founded in 1961.

In 1963 the Commercial & Industrial Association of Guarulhos was founded, nowadays, the institution is called Commerce & Business Association of Guarulhos (Associação Comercial e Empresarial de Guarulhos – ACE).

With the big boom of the Industrial sector, a large number of manpower was drawn. This new population settled in an urban area on a continuous process of land occupation. At this rate the population grew from 35,000 in 1950 to 101,000 in 1960, from 237,000 in 1970 to 532,726 in 1980. Most of these citizens devoted themselves to Industrial activities in Guarulhos (that hosts around 2,000 establishments), and São Paulo.

In 1985 the Cumbica Airport was opened. Today it is called "International Airport of São Paulo–Guarulhos Governor André Franco Montoro" (Aeroporto Internacional de São Paulo–Guarulhos Governador André Franco Montoro), the second-biggest airport in Latin America.

Between 2000 and 2006, its population grew three times as much as São Paulo State. According to IBGE, Guarulhos is the second most populous city in the State after São Paulo Capital. Most of its population is economically active and evenly distributed in terms of gender.

Notable people
 Rebeca Andrade, gymnast
 Any Gabrielly, singer, dancer, and actress
 Marques Batista de Abreu, footballer and, beginning in 2011, politician
 Cristiano Marques Gomes, footballer
 Edson Ribeiro, sprinter
 Mamonas Assassinas, rock band from the 1990s
 David Braz, footballer
 Gabriel Martinelli, footballer
 Jaimerson Xavier, footballer
 David da Silva, footballer

Climate
Climate is characterized by relatively high temperatures and evenly distributed precipitation throughout the year. The Köppen Climate Classification subtype for this climate is "Cfa" (Humid Subtropical Climate).

Transportation
The main highway to serve Guarulhos is the Rodovia Presidente Dutra, from São Paulo to Rio de Janeiro.

In 2018, the Companhia Paulista de Trens Metropolitanos commuter rail system's Line 13–Jade was opened, connecting São Paulo–Guarulhos International Airport with Engenheiro Goulart. In 2021, construction will begin on the first line of the São Paulo Metro to serve Guarulhos, Line 19–Sky Blue.

São Paulo Air Force Base - BASP, a base of the Brazilian Air Force, is located in Guarulhos.

See also
List of municipalities in the state of São Paulo by population

References

External links

  Locação de Galpões em Guarulhos.
  Estacionamento Aeroporto Guarulhos.
  Guarulhos - Yellow Pages .
  City Hall of Guarulhos .
  Guia de Guarulhos.
  Guarulhos.
  - Guarulhos Online.
  - Guia Guarulhos de Negócios.
  Encontra Guarulhos - Find everything about Guarulhos city.
  Portal de Guarulhos - Portal of Guarulhos City.

 
Populated places established in 1560